Schenkeliella is a monotypic genus of Sri Lankan long-jawed orb-weavers containing the single species, Schenkeliella spinosa. The species was first described by Octavius Pickard-Cambridge in 1871 under the name Oeta spinosa, but it was renamed to "Schenkeliella" by Embrik Strand in 1934 because the name was already in use for a genus of ermine moths. Originally placed with the Nesticidae, it transferred to the Tetragnathidae in 1980.

See also
Ermine moth
List of Tetragnathidae species

References

Invertebrates of Sri Lanka
Monotypic Araneomorphae genera
Spiders of Asia
Taxa named by Embrik Strand
Tetragnathidae